Berndt Wilhelm Schauman (8 November 1857 – 14 November 1911) was a Finnish industrialist, the most important in Jakobstad at the beginning of the 20th century. He was the older brother of Ossian Schauman, and a member of the Schauman noble family. Wilhelm Schauman's first industrial installation was a small chicory (coffee additive/substitute) factory, which he founded in 1883. He was also involved in the local tobacco factory as part of the management. Apart from this, he continuously founded new enterprises such as a sugar refinery, a steam-powered saw mill and a plywood factory, which was the first of its kind in Finland. His enterprises soon expanded beyond the borders of Jakobstad.

A paper and pulp mill was later built in Jakobstad, and remains today as the largest factory in Jakobstad. It is owned by UPM-Kymmene, as a result of a merger in 1988.

Life

After graduating as a mechanical engineer in 1879, Schauman gained employment at a metal factory in St. Petersburg, Russia. Four years later, his young wife (Mimmi Roos) wanted to return home, and the couple decided to return to their hometown Jakobstad when Schauman was turned down for the post of technical director at the Serlachius Mänttä Mills (despite having received some initial promises). After visiting chicory factories in Germany and Russia, he started his own chicory factory in Jakobstad in the Thodén bakery in the centre of town, employing 6 or 7 people. Chicory is a coffee substitute. The factory met with great success and proved to be very profitable, after which Schauman started to build a second production site just outside town in 1884. Within a few years, he was the largest chicory producer in Finland.

After a fire destroyed the second factory in 1892, Schauman built a third close to the harbour. This factory became operational in 1893, and is today a museum, housing the original machinery. Initially, the raw material was supplied from Germany, while later Belgium became the most important supplier of chicory root, followed by the Netherlands, Imperial Russia, Estonia and Poland.

The business boomed as Schauman combined a high quality product at competitive prices with successful marketing strategies. Schauman employed his own agents in cities such as Helsinki, Turku, Tampere and Viipuri, and was careful to design attractive packaging with Russian type print consisting of medallions and other embellishments. Schauman would himself travel around Finland, inviting shopkeepers to sample his products. At the peak of production in 1903, Schauman employed 60 employees, producing close to 1400 tons of roasted and ground chicory.

After the mid-1890s, Schauman diversified into other business activities such as the export of timber goods, towboat operations, the production of saw goods and he also founded a sugar refinery on the Alholmen peninsula outside Jakobstad. In 1889, Schauman was elected to the board of directors of the Ph. U. Strengberg tobacco factory, and seven years later, he was given the post of chairman and CEO. The Strengberg tobaccy factory was at this time the largest producer of cigarettes in the Nordic countries, and also the first internal tobacco producer in the Nordic region.

Schauman continued to expand his personal business empire and in 1910 he purchased a steam-powered saw mill in Yxpila (near Karleby) and the same year he founded a plywood factory in Jyväskylä. He did not live to see the factory completed, however, as he died suddenly during a business trip to Berlin on 14 November 1911. His fortune at the time of his death was estimated as 2 million Finnish Marks.

Industrial expansion

After Wilhelm Schaumans death in 1911, and in accordance with his last will, his business activities were transferred under the ownership of a newly created and publicly traded company Oy Wilhelm Schauman Ab. After divestment of the sugar interests, the company concentrated on its plywood processing plants, eventually becoming the market leader in plywood products. The Jyväskylä plywood mill was a promising and highly profitable new venture, and the mill flourished during the early years of World War I. Plywood production also began in Savonlinna in 1921, and a plywood mill in Joensuu was acquired in 1924. The mills at Jyväskylä, Savonlinna, and Joensuu were all later merged into the Oy Wilh. Schauman Ab entity.

During World War II the proportion of plywood products rose considerably, and in 1958 a chipboard mill was opened in Jyväskylä. A chipboard mill was purchased from Viiala Oy in 1962, and in 1969 Oy Wilh. Schauman Ab opened a chipboard mill in Joensuu, and by the early 1990s the company had chipboard mills in Joensuu, Ristiina (Pellos chipboard mill), and Kitee (Puhos chipboard mill).

The chicory production in Jakobstad also continued after Schaumans death, and it consistently made a profit every year between 1912 and 1935, although its overall contribution to the company results was relatively modest. However, the demand and production of chicory was in terminal decline, except during the period of World War II, when chicory demand temporarily surged due to the restricted availability of coffee. The Jakobstad factory produced its last batch of chicory in February 1960, and the last shipment from the warehouse was made in September 1964.

The foundation of Schauman's paper-and-pulp operations was laid with the construction of a sulfite pulp mill in Jakobstad in 1934. In the early 1960s, a sulfate pulp mill, a paper mill, and a paper sack plant were added. During the first half of the 1970s, major investments were made in pulp manufacturing, and this made Schauman the largest producer of market pulp in Finland. The paper sack plant in Jakobstad soon became the largest of its kind in Finland, and in 1969 Schauman purchased the Craf'Sac plant in Rouen, France. Schauman had already become a world leader in plywood product development by the beginning of the 1960s, grabbing additional market share through the use of new and innovative production methods for gluing, coating and processing of plywood, as well as through the use of spruce as raw material.

Schauman at various points in its history also acquired business activities that did not fit well with its core activities, such as the making of furniture, along with more conventional converted panel products. In 1971, Schauman also became a producer of large sailing yachts after having bought Nautor, a boatyard located outside Jakobstad. Eventually, all such non-core businesses were divested.

External links
History of UPM-Kymmene
Chicory Museum in Jakobstad

1857 births
1911 deaths
People from Jakobstad
People from Vaasa Province (Grand Duchy of Finland)
Swedish-speaking Finns
Finnish people of German descent
Finnish businesspeople
19th-century Finnish businesspeople